Myrciaria ferruginea is a disputed species of plant in the family Myrtaceae and is endemic to the east of Brazil. Some authorities believe that this plant is a synonym of Myrciaria floribunda.

References

ferruginea
Crops originating from the Americas
Tropical fruit
Flora of South America
Endemic flora of Brazil
Fruits originating in South America
Cauliflory
Fruit trees
Berries